Márcio Amoroso dos Santos (born 5 July 1974) is a Brazilian football pundit and former professional player who mainly played as a forward. He played for several teams in his home country as well as in Japan, Italy, Germany, Spain and Greece while also representing Brazil at international level, winning the 1999 Copa América. In his prime, he was a very talented striker with great dribbling skills and goalscoring ability who was also capable of creating chances for teammates.

Club career 
Amoroso started his career at homeland club Guarani FC at 1992. In July 1992, he was loaned to a Japanese outfit Verdy Kawasaki (J.League Division 1), winning two J-League titles, and returned to Guarani FC two years later, finishing the 1994 Campeonato Brasileiro Série A as the season's top scorer. In 1996, he transferred to Flamengo, but he came to prominence playing in the Italian Serie A for unfashionable Udinese in the late-1990s. There he starred alongside Oliver Bierhoff in a side which played an adventurous 3–4–3 formation, finishing his first season with the club in third place in Serie A. When the league's top scorer Oliver Bierhoff left the club for A.C. Milan in 1998, many thought Udinese Calcio would struggle to repeat their success, but that very next season Amoroso himself became the focus of the team, and was the top scorer in Serie A with 22 goals. The following season, he transferred to the defending UEFA Cup and Coppa Italia champions Parma for an astounding €30 million. Although the team started the season strongly, winning the 1999 Supercoppa Italiana, Parma never quite fulfilled their potential to win the league title, and Amoroso was not able to match the form he managed with Udinese due to recurring injury problems; the club did manage to reach the 2001 Coppa Italia final, however.

After two seasons, Amoroso was soon on the move again, this time to Borussia Dortmund in Germany, for 50 million Deutsche Mark (€25 million), a German record at that time. Amoroso won the Bundesliga title during the 2001–02 season, and was also the league's top scorer. He helped the club to the 2002 UEFA Cup Final, where his goal (a penalty) could not prevent the team from losing 3–2 to Feyenoord. During his next two seasons with the club, his appearances were more limited however, due to recurring injury problems. Amoroso played for Málaga during the 2004–05 season, although he was mainly used as a substitute, scoring only 5 goals in 29 appearances, as Málaga finished the season in 10th place in the league.

Amoroso moved to São Paulo in the summer of 2005 and immediately helped them to the Copa Libertadores, the most prestigious club prize in South America. In January 2006, after having won the FIFA Club World Championship, finishing the tournament as top scorer, he returned to Italy, signing an 18-month contract for A.C. Milan as a replacement for Christian Vieri, who had transferred to Monaco.

After an unsuccessful spell, Amoroso agreed to cancel his contract with A.C. Milan on 1 September 2006, and immediately signed a new contract with Corinthians. Amoroso quickly received the no. 10 jersey from Corinthians as a replacement for Carlos Tevez (who left SC Corinthians Paulista and moved to West Ham United). But there he could not show the football that he was capable of, having his contract resigned in April 2007, signing in for Grêmio. Since August, Amoroso did not play for Grêmio, having his contract resigned due to lack of form. In January 2008, he signed a one-and-a-half year contract with Aris Thessaloniki. However, he spent only six months in Thessaloniki. On 29 December 2008, Amoroso returned to Guarani for the 2009 season. He retired at the end of the season, at the age of 34, due to injury struggles, despite not making an appearance for the club that year.

International career 
Amoroso scored 9 goals in 19 appearances for Brazil between 1995 and 2003. He made his debut in a 5–0 win over Chile, and was later a member of the squad that won the 1999 Copa América.

Individual 
Aris Thessaloniki was Amoroso's 12th club in six countries. He won 20 trophies and personal awards, including the Copa América with Brazil and both the FIFA Club World Championship and Copa Libertadores with São Paulo. He has also played for Verdy Kawasaki, Flamengo, Udinese, Parma, Borussia Dortmund, Málaga, Milan, Corinthians, Grêmio and Guarani which was his last club.

Amoroso was the top scorer in three national championships, and broke the Bundesliga transfer record when he moved to Borussia Dortmund from Parma in the middle of 2001.

Career statistics

Club

International

Honours 
Verdy Kawasaki
J.League Division 1: 1993

Flamengo
Campeonato Carioca: 1996
Copa de Oro: 1996

Parma
Supercoppa Italiana: 1999
Coppa Italia runner-up: 2001

Borussia Dortmund
Bundesliga: 2001–02
UEFA Cup runner-up: 2001–02

São Paulo
Copa Libertadores: 2005
FIFA Club World Championship: 2005

Boca Raton FC
American Premier Soccer League: 2016

Brazil
Copa América: 1999

 Individual 
Bola de Ouro: 1994
Bola de Prata: 1994
Campeonato Brasileiro Série A top scorer: 1994
Serie A Top scorer: 1998–99
Bundesliga top scorer: 2001–02
Toyota Award: 2005
FIFA Club World Championship top scorer: 2005

Notes

References

External links 
 
 Brazilian Footballer of the Year 1994
 
 

1974 births
Footballers from Brasília
Living people
Association football forwards
Brazilian footballers
Brazil international footballers
Brazilian expatriate footballers
Brazilian expatriate sportspeople in Japan
Expatriate footballers in Japan
Brazilian expatriate sportspeople in Italy
Expatriate footballers in Italy
Brazilian expatriate sportspeople in Germany
Expatriate footballers in Germany
Brazilian expatriate sportspeople in Spain
Expatriate footballers in Spain
Brazilian expatriate sportspeople in Greece
Expatriate footballers in Greece
Expatriate soccer players in the United States
Guarani FC players
Tokyo Verdy players
CR Flamengo footballers
Udinese Calcio players
Parma Calcio 1913 players
Borussia Dortmund players
Málaga CF players
A.C. Milan players
São Paulo FC players
Aris Thessaloniki F.C. players
Sport Club Corinthians Paulista players
Grêmio Foot-Ball Porto Alegrense players
Boca Raton FC players
Campeonato Brasileiro Série A players
J1 League players
Serie A players
Bundesliga players
La Liga players
Super League Greece players
Kicker-Torjägerkanone Award winners
1999 Copa América players
Copa América-winning players
Copa Libertadores-winning players